This is a List of Melbourne High School alumni, they being notable former students – known as "Old Boys" of the public selective school, the Melbourne High School in South Yarra, Victoria, Australia.

In 2001, The Sun-Herald ranked Melbourne High School third in Australia's top ten boys' schools, based on the number of its alumni mentioned in the Who's Who in Australia (a listing of notable Australians).

Academic
 Professor Frederick Alexander – historian
 Professor George Keith Batchelor – applied mathematician and fluid dynamicist, founder of the Journal of Fluid Mechanics
 Professor Noel Bayliss, CBE – chemist
 Professor G. S. Browne, Education, Melbourne University
 Professor Warner Max Corden – economist
 Dr Kevin Donnelly - Australian educator and Senior Research Fellow, Australian Catholic University
 Professor Ian Gust, AO – researcher on microbiology and immunology, former research and development director for CSL Limited
 Professor A. N. Hambly, Physics and Chemistry, Melbourne University
 Professor E. S. J. King, Professor of Pathology at Melbourne University
 Major-General A. H. Ramsay, Director of Education
 Professor J. Hyam Rubinstein – Professor of Mathematics at the University of Melbourne
 Professor John Tasioulas – Director of Institute for Ethics in AI and Professor of Ethics and Legal Philosophy at University of Oxford
Professor S. L. Townsend, Obstetrics and Gynaecology, Melbourne University
 Professor Frank T. M. White - Foundation Professor, Mining and Metallurgical Engineering, University of Queensland; Macdonald Professor of Mining Engineering and Applied Geophysics, McGill University

Business
Ray Evans — businessman
John Gandel – billionaire businessman and the ninth richest Australian in the 2011 BRW Rich 200.
Ruslan Kogan – founder and CEO of Kogan Technologies
Michael Gudinski – entrepreneurial businessman, founder of Mushroom Records
Geoff Lord - founder and CEO of Belgravia Group
Daniel CM May - Tech entrepreneur, Co-founder of LIFX
Ian MacFarlane – former Governor of the Reserve Bank of Australia
David Morgan – former Westpac CEO
Bruce Ruxton AM OBE – President of the RSL (1979–2002)
Lindsay Fox AC – billionaire CEO and Founder of trucking company Linfox and the seventeenth richest Australian in the 2011 BRW Rich 200.

Entertainment, media and the arts
Graeme Base – author and artist
Andrew Bergen – Journalist, photographer, musician, record label manager & DJ
Leigh Bowery – Fashion designer
Ashley Browne – sports journalist
Thanh Bui – Australian Idol contestant, Season 6, 2008, 8th place
George Dreyfus – noted Australian composer
Jon Faine – ABC broadcaster
Raimond Gaita – Philosopher, and author of Memoir "Romulus, my Father"
Dean Geyer – Australian Idol contestant, Season 4, 2006, 3rd place
Harry Gordon – journalist and Olympic historian
Athol Guy – Member of Australian Folk band The Seekers
Nazeem Hussain - Comedian
Graham Kennedy – television personality
George Megalogenis – Journalist
Keith Potger – Member of Australian Folk band The Seekers
Imre Salusinszky – columnist for The Australian and Chair of the Australia Council
Jonathon Welch - Opera singer, conductor and founder of The Choir of Hard Knocks  
Bruce Woodley – Member of Australian Folk band The Seekers
Hieu Nguyen– digital artist

Medicine and science
Sir John Eccles, AC, FRS – Nobel Prize winner for Medicine
 Professor George Keith Batchelor – applied mathematician and fluid dynamicist, founder of the Journal of Fluid Mechanics
 Professor Noel Bayliss, CBE – chemist
 Professor Ian Gust, AO – researcher on microbiology and immunology, former research and development director for CSL Limited
 Professor Jeffrey Rosenfeld, AC, OBE - neurosurgeon
 Professor Sir Leslie H. Martin (1900–1983) – physicist
 J. Hyam Rubinstein – Professor of Mathematics at the University of Melbourne
 Professor Brett Sutton - Victorian Chief Health Officer

Military
Sir Frank Horton Berryman – Australian Army general and Royal Military College, Duntroon, graduate
Keith William "Bluey" Truscott – Commanding Officer No. 76 Squadron RAAF, World War II fighter ace and Melbourne AFL player (after whom the club's annual Best and Fairest award is named)
Air Vice Marshal Henry Wrigley – founding member of the RAAF
Julian Knight - Australian Army cadet and reservist, perpetrator of the Hoddle Street massacre

Politics, public service and the law
Maurice Ashkanasy – Australian Barrister and former Chairman of the Victorian Bar Council
Alan Bird – MHR (ALP) for Division of Batman (1949–1962)
Daniel Bowen – President of the Public Transport Users Association
Alex Chernov AO QC – Justice of the Supreme Court; Chancellor of the University of Melbourne; Governor of the State of Victoria
Frank Crean – MHR (ALP), Deputy Prime Minister, Minister for Overseas Trade
Simon Crean – MHR (ALP), Federal Opposition leader (2001–2003), Minister for Trade (2007 – 2013)
Bill Cutts – diplomat
Rae Else-Mitchell – judge of the New South Wales Supreme Court and legal scholar
Gareth Evans AC QC – Chancellor of Australian National University; Senator (ALP) (1978–1996); MHR (1996–1999); Foreign Minister (1988–1996); Barrister
John Galbally CBE QC – MHR (ALP); Barrister
Max Gillies AM – political satirist
Brian Howe - AO MHR (ALP), Deputy Prime Minister
Barry Jones AO – MHR (ALP) (1977–1998), former Minister for Science
Joseph Kay, AM. Former judge of the appeal division of the Family Court of Australia
Ron Merkel QC – Former Justice of the Federal Court of Australia; Recipient of the Human Rights Medal
Alan Missen – Senator Liberal Party
Robert Redlich – Justice of the Court of Appeal, Supreme Court of Victoria
Alan Stockdale – former Victorian MLA, (Lib), Victorian Treasurer (1992–1999), Macquarie Banker (1999–2005)
James Bawtree Webb, OBE – Influential in shaping Australia's international relations and aid during the 1950s, '60s and '70s
Mark Weinberg – Justice of the Court of Appeal, Supreme Court of Victoria
Isi Leibler CBE, AO - Jewish Community Leader and Businessman

Religion
Raymond Apple - leading Australian rabbi

Sport
Australian Football League – Members of the AFL Hall of Fame
Brian Dixon – Melbourne Football Club
Dale Weightman – Richmond Football Club
Neil Roberts – St Kilda Football Club
Gordon Roy Wright – Richmond Football Club
Tom Hafey – Richmond Football Club

Australian Football League – Members of the Team of the Century for each AFL club
Brian Dixon – Melbourne Football Club, wing
Matthew Knights – Richmond Football Club, interchange bench
Garry Lyon – Melbourne Football Club, half-forward flank
Billy Picken – Collingwood Football Club, half-back flank
Neil Roberts – St Kilda Football Club, centre-half back
Dale Weightman – Richmond Football Club, forward pocket
Gordon Roy Wright – Richmond Football Club, 1st ruckman
Tom Hafey – Richmond Football Club, coach
 
Australian Football League (players)

Collingwood Football Club
Rene Kink – 7th in Brownlow Medal count 1979
Phil Manassa – after whom the AFL Goal-of-the-Year award is named
Billy Picken – Best and Fairest 1978 and 1983, 3rd in the Brownlow Medal count 1977

Hawthorn Football Club
David Parkin – Captain 1971 premiership team, Best and Fairest 1965

Melbourne Football Club
Cameron Bruce – Co-captain 2008, Best and Fairest 2008
Ross Dillon – Leading goalkicker 1969 & 1970
Brian Dixon – Member of 5 premiership teams, Best and Fairest 1960, Tassie Medal 1961, All-Australian 1961
Dick Fenton-Smith, Two-time premiership player
Andy Lovell – Runner-up Best and Fairest 1992, Harold Ball Memorial Trophy
Glenn Lovett – Best and Fairest 1992
Garry Lyon – Captain 1991–97, Best and Fairest 1990, 1994, All-Australian 1993–95
David Schwarz – Vice-Captain 2000, Best and Fairest 1999
Stephen Tingay – Runner-up Best and Fairest 1994, All-Australian 1994

North Melbourne Football Club
Will Walker – Midfielder 
Richmond Football Club
Matthew Knights – Captain 1997–2000, Best and Fairest 1990 & 1992, Runner-up for the Brownlow medal 1995
Mark Lee – Member of 1980 Premiership team, Captain 1985–86, Best and Fairest 1984, All-Australian 1980, 1983, 1985
Stephen Ryan – Member of 1989 Under 19s Premiership team, Leading goalkicker 1990
Dale Weightman – Member 1980 Premiership team, Captain 1988–92, Best and Fairest 1986–87, Tassie Medal 1985, All-Australian 1985–86,1988
Gordon Roy Wright – Captain 1958–59, Best and Fairest 1951–52,1954,1957, All-Australian 1956

St Kilda Football Club
David Grant – Runner-up Best and Fairest 1989, All Australian 1991
Keith Ross Miller MBE – Also a champion Test cricketer
Neil Roberts – Captain 1959–62, Best and Fairest 1955 & 1958, All-Australian 1958
John Stephens – Leading goalkicker 1972
Spencer White

West Coast Eagles
Andy Lovell – Runner-up Best and Fairest 1992 (Melbourne Football Club), Harold Ball Memorial Trophy

Australian Football League (Brownlow medalists)
Neil Roberts – St Kilda Football Club 1958
Gordon Roy Wright – Richmond Football Club 1952 & 1954

Australian Football League (coaches)
Tom Hafey – Richmond Football Club, Collingwood Football Club, Geelong Football Club, Sydney Football Club
Matthew Knights – Essendon Football Club
David Parkin – Hawthorn Football Club (premiers 1978), Carlton Football Club (premiers 1981–82 and 1995), and Fitzroy Football Club.

Australian Football League (administrators)
Lindsay Fox AC – President of the St Kilda Football Club

Australian Football League (television personalities)
Garry Lyon – Nine Network
David Schwarz – Seven Network

Cricket
Keith Miller MBE – Test cricketer, former VFL player
Doug Ring – Test cricketer
Jack Wilson – Test cricketer
William Maldon Woodfull – Australian Test cricket captain, he returned to the school as a mathematics teacher and became principal.

National Basketball League
Andrew Parkinson – NBL player

National Football League
Jordan Berry – NFL punter, Pittsburgh Steelers

Olympians
Ron Clarke – Olympian, former holder of 17 world records for long distance running, philanthropist and Mayor of the Gold Coast
Ralph Doubell – Olympic athlete, 1968 800m Gold Medallist 
Nick Green – Australian Olympic Rower and member of the Oarsome Foursome
Peter Winter – Olympic athlete
Peter Lloyd (gymnast) Olympic Games. Attended MHS in 1967.

Notes
  Lindsay Fox He has maintained a good relationship with the school and has made many large donations. As part of this relationship he is permitted to land his helicopter on the school football oval whenever required.

See also
 List of non-government schools in Victoria

References

The vast majority of listed Old Boys are sourced from: .

External links

Melbourne High School
Melbourne-related lists
 List
 List